Trouble Blues is an album by blues musician Curtis Jones recorded in 1960 and released on the Bluesville label the following year.

Reception

AllMusic stated: "The taciturn pianist in the company of a fine New York rhythm section and Johnny "Big Moose" Walker (but on guitar, not piano) made for a winning combination on this 1960 album".

Track listing
All compositions by Curtis Jones except where noted
 "Lonesome Bedroom Blues" – 3:26
 "A Whole Lot of Talk for You" – 3:00
 "Suicide Blues" (Armand "Jump" Jackson) – 4:09
 "Please Say Yes" (Ozzie Cadena) – 2:38
 "Weekend Blues" – 3:32
 "Good Woman Blues" (Jackson) – 2:43
 "Trouble Blues" (Cadena, Jones) – 5:05
 "Love Season Blues" – 3:58
 "Low Down Worried Blues" – 3:07
 "Good Time Special" – 2:10
 "Fool Blues" (Jackson) – 2:37
 "Pinetop Boogie" (Pinetop Smith) – 2:54 Additional track on CD reissue

Personnel
Performance 
Curtis Jones – piano, vocals
Robert Banks – organ
Johnny "Big Moose" Walker – guitar
Leonard Gaskin – bass
Sticks Evans – drums

Production 
 Ozzie Cadena – supervision
 Rudy Van Gelder – engineer

References

Curtis Jones (pianist) albums
1961 albums
Bluesville Records albums
Albums recorded at Van Gelder Studio
Albums produced by Ozzie Cadena